Imaye Taga (sometimes Amaya or Amiya, born 1 February 1985) is an Ethiopian-born Israeli former footballer who played for the Israel U21 national team, and currently serves as a member of the city council of Netanya, Israel.

Biography
Imaye (Amir) Taga was born in Ethiopia to an Ethiopian-Jewish family. The family immigrated to Israel in 1991 during Operation Solomon when he was 6 years old. On 11 August 2006 Amiya's younger brother Avi Taga was found dead by his eldest brother and the Israeli Police in Kiryat Ekron.  Taga had been missing from home since Wednesday, 9 August 2006. Club officials went to visit the player at his family residence to console him during the traditional Jewish mourning period of the Shiva.

In 2007 he changed his name back to his childhood name.  "Imaye" in the Amharic language means "a child".

Sports career
Taga attended the ORT boarding school in Netanya where he was discovered by scouts of the local side - Maccabi Netanya. Taga grew up through the ranks at Netanya, he played throughout the youth system and made his debut for the senior side at the 2003–04 season. He played for six years in the first team.

On July 28, 2010, he left Netanya and signed a two years contract with Hapoel Ashkelon. After two years spent in Ashkelon, Taga signed with Hapoel Acre on April 11, 2012.

On July 5, 2015, after five years of playing outside of Netanya, Taga returned to play for his home club of Maccabi Netanya. After 2 seasons with Netanya, Taga retired from football as he ventured into local politics. Taga is regarded as local legend in Netanya as he played 186 games in all club competitions in a total of 8 years playing for Maccabi Netanya.

On 28 February 2006, Taga made his debut for the Israel U-21s in a friendly game against Ukraine. On 11 October 2006, Taga scored the historic goal for Israel in the playoff game against France, which secured Israel's shock qualification to UEFA U-21 Championship 2007 with a 2–1 aggregate win.

On 3 August 2010, Taga got called up for the senior national team for the first time in his career. He was about to win his first cap for the national team, but an injury prevented that from happening and Taga never played a single game for the national team.

Honours
Toto Cup (Leumit):
Winner (1): 2004–05
Liga Leumit:
Winner (1): 2016–17
Runner-up (1): 2004–05
Israeli Premier League:
Runner-up (2): 2006–07, 2007–08

Club career statistics
(correct as of 11.8.15)

References

External links

1985 births
Living people
Ethiopian Jews
Ethiopian emigrants to Israel
Citizens of Israel through Law of Return
Israeli Jews
Israeli footballers
Association football midfielders
Maccabi Netanya F.C. players
Hapoel Ashkelon F.C. players
Hapoel Acre F.C. players
Liga Leumit players
Israeli Premier League players
Footballers from Netanya
Israel under-21 international footballers